The Cascada de Misol-Há (Ch’ol language for "Water Falls") is a waterfall located in the Municipality of Salto de Agua, 20 kilometers from Palenque by the road that leads towards San Cristóbal de las Casas.

This waterfall consists of one single cascade of 35 m in height that falls into a single, almost circular, pool amidst tropical vegetation. The water is a clear blue color due to its high mineral content. Behind the cascade there is a cave approximately 20 m in length. The pool is suitable for swimming.

References

External links

Landforms of Chiapas
Waterfalls of Mexico
Tourism in Mexico
Tourist attractions in Chiapas